Cicadula is a genus of true bugs belonging to the family Cicadellidae.

The genus was first described by Zetterstedt in 1840.

The species of this genus are found in Europe, Northern America, Southern Africa.

Species:
 Cicadula quadrinotata
 Cicadula quinquenotata

References

Cicadellidae
Hemiptera genera